"Throw Your Set in the Air" is a song by Cypress Hill, released in 1995 as the lead single from their third album, Cypress Hill III: Temples of Boom. Along with "Insane in the Brain", the song is used in The Simpsons episode "Homerpalooza".

Feud with Ice Cube
According to B-Real and DJ Muggs, the rapper Ice Cube stole the hook of his song "Friday", the theme song of the 1995 comedy film Friday, from "Throw Your Set in the Air". This ignited a feud between Cypress Hill and Ice Cube's supergroup Westside Connection, which resulted in three diss tracks: "No Rest for the Wicked" on Cypress Hill III: Temples of Boom (by Cypress Hill), "King of the Hill" on Bow Down (by Westside Connection) and "Ice Cube Killa" (non-album single by Cypress Hill).

Critical reception
James Masterton for Dotmusic said the new single "represents no progression on their previous work, but to its credit it is one of the more accessible rap records around at present." Pan-European magazine Music & Media commented, "Advise your listeners to follow the instructions given by the Hispanic rappers in this song title. The bang of the exploding radio will be less weird than the noises featured on the record." A reviewer from Music Week rated it three out of five, adding that "the godfathers of stoned rap return with a laid-back offering that will please fans."

Music video
The song's music video shows the group performing the song in various places along with images of Buddha.

Track listing
Club Remix

Charts

References

1995 songs
1995 singles
Cypress Hill songs
Ruffhouse Records singles
Columbia Records singles
Sony Music singles
Hardcore hip hop songs
Songs written by DJ Muggs
Songs written by B-Real
Song recordings produced by DJ Muggs